Slade Green railway station is in the London Borough of Bexley, southeast London, on the North Kent Line.

The station was built in 1900 to serve the developing community. It opened as "Slades Green" and it was not until 1953 that this was changed to Slade Green. There was a level crossing across the tracks at the south end of the station but this and the signal box closed in November 1970 when the line was resignalled. As of 2019 the station and  trains serving it are operated by Southeastern and Thameslink.

Services 

The typical off-peak service in trains per hour is:
 4 tph to London Cannon Street (2 of these run via  and 2 run via )
 2 tph to  via Greenwich 
 2 tph to  via 
 2 tph to 

During the peak hours, the station is served by an additional half-hourly circular service to and from London Cannon Street via  and Lewisham in the clockwise direction and via Greenwich in the anticlockwise direction.

Connections
London Buses routes 89, 99 and 428 serve the station.

Future development

Studies by Crossrail Ltd. identified Gravesend as the preferred termination point. However, the same studies found Slade Green station to be the outermost station with sufficient capacity to support Crossrail. Rail Freight studies seeking to extend traffic in the opposite direction, with a planned multi modal distribution centre between Slade Green and Dartford, meant that extending Crossrail beyond Slade Green would require additional tracks and possibly a viaduct. From 2009, the commuter route through Slade Green has been safeguarded for future Crossrail extensions.

References

External links 

Railway stations in the London Borough of Bexley
Former South Eastern Railway (UK) stations
Railway stations in Great Britain opened in 1900
Railway stations served by Southeastern
Railway stations served by Govia Thameslink Railway